Carlos D. López Bonilla is a Puerto Rican politician and the current mayor of Rincón, Puerto Rico. López is affiliated with the Popular Democratic Party (PPD) and has served as mayor since 2001. He earned a Bachelor of Arts from the Interamerican University of Puerto Rico at San Germán.

References

1960 births
Living people
Interamerican University of Puerto Rico alumni
Mayors of places in Puerto Rico
Popular Democratic Party (Puerto Rico) politicians
People from Rincón, Puerto Rico